Bernard Ward may refer to:

Bernard Ward, 1st Viscount Bangor (1719–1781), Irish MP for Down, Bangor and Killyleagh
Bernard Ward (bishop) (1857–1920), English Roman Catholic writer
Bernard Ward (sailor) (1918–?), Bermudian Olympic sailor
Bernard Evans Ward (1857–1933), British painter
Bernard J. Ward (1925–1982), American legal educator and authority on the federal courts
Bernard Joseph Ward (1879–1950), British urologist
Bernard Mordaunt Ward (1893–1945), British soldier and biographer
Bernie Ward (born 1951), American radio personality